Un hijo cayó del cielo (English: A child fell out of the sky) is a Mexican telenovela produced by Televisa and broadcast by Telesistema Mexicano in 1962.

Cast 
Miguel Córcega
Ángel Garasa
Bárbara Gil
Héctor Suárez

References

External links 

Mexican telenovelas
1962 telenovelas
Televisa telenovelas
1962 Mexican television series debuts
1962 Mexican television series endings
Spanish-language telenovelas